George Kinnaird, 1st Lord Kinnaird (c. 1622–29 December 1689) was a 17th-century Scottish aristocrat. A Royalist, in 1661, after the Restoration, he was made a member of the Privy Council of Scotland. He sat in Parliament from 1661 to 1663 for Perthshire. 

In 1678, he passed his lands and baronies of Inchmichael and Inchture to his son Patrick. Charles II knighted him 28 December 1682 and he became Lord Kinnaird of Inchture (Peerage of Scotland).

References

Kinnaird, 1st Lord}}
1622 births
1689 deaths
Lords of Parliament (pre-1707)
Peers of Scotland created by Charles II
Members of the Privy Council of Scotland
Cavaliers
Shire Commissioners to the Parliament of Scotland
Members of the Parliament of Scotland 1661–1663
Members of the Parliament of Scotland 1685–1686
Knights Bachelor
Scottish knights